Baldivis is an electoral district of the Legislative Assembly of Western Australia. It is located in Perth's southern suburbs, and named after the suburb of Baldivis.

Baldivis was created by the Western Australian Electoral Commission in a 2015 redistribution, and elected its first member at the 2017 state election. It incorporated areas that previously fell into the seats of Kwinana and Warnbro. Baldivis was estimated to have a notional 6.4-point majority for the Labor Party (based on the results of the 2013 election), and was considered a safe seat for that party.

Geography
At the 2021 state election, Baldivis includes parts of the suburbs of Baldivis, Cooloongup, Leda, Waikiki and Wellard.

Members for Baldivis

Election results

References

External links
 ABC election profiles: 2017
 WAEC district maps: 2015

Electoral districts of Western Australia
2017 establishments in Australia
Constituencies established in 2017